Robyn Williams (born 31 August 1986) is a former Australian cricketer who is a right-handed batter and right-arm medium bowler. During the mid-2000s, she played six List A matches for Western Australia in the Women's National Cricket League (WNCL).

References

External links
 
 

1986 births
Place of birth missing (living people)
Living people
Australian cricketers
Australian women cricketers
Western Australia women cricketers